Yunguyo is a town in the Puno Region in southeastern Peru. It is the capital of Yunguyo Province and Yunguyo District. It has a population of 12,625 (2008 estimate).

Yunguyo is located on a peninsula on the shores of Lake Titicaca. The border with Bolivia runs next to the town and a road connects it with the town of Copacabana located a few kilometers away on the Bolivian side of the peninsula.

Populated places in the Puno Region